Edison School District may refer to:

Edison School District (Edison, California)
Edison School District 54JT, Colorado
Edison Township Public Schools, New Jersey
Edison Local School District, Ohio
Edison Local School District (Erie County), Ohio

See also
Burlington-Edison School District
EdisonLearning, formerly known as Edison Schools